The Thing About Pam is an American true crime comedy-drama television miniseries detailing the involvement of Pam Hupp in the 2011 murder of Betsy Faria. It stars Renée Zellweger, Josh Duhamel, Judy Greer, Gideon Adlon, Sean Bridgers, Suanne Spoke, Mac Brandt, Katy Mixon, and Glenn Fleshler. Jenny Klein serves as showrunner for the series.

After Peacock Productions was shut down, NBC News Studios was launched with the intention of creating documentary-style content. The series was announced in May 2020 when the company revealed a partnership with Blumhouse Television. It is based on coverage from Dateline NBC and is titled after a Dateline podcast of the same name. In February 2021, the series was given a six-episode order with Zellweger joining the cast and the production as an executive producer. Filming took place in New Orleans.

The Thing About Pam premiered on NBC on March 8, 2022. It received mixed reviews from critics. Though some praised Zellweger's performance as Hupp in her network television debut, others criticized the comedic tone used to convey the story of a real murder.

Premise 
The Thing About Pam details the murder of Betsy Faria, a cancer-stricken woman found dead in her home in Troy, Missouri, in December 2011. Betsy's friend, house-flipper Pam Hupp, told the police she was the last person to see her on the night of her death after insisting on driving her home. The police suspected Betsy's husband, Russ, as the culprit and arrested him, but when his conviction was overturned, holes appeared in Pam's testimony, revealing a diabolical scheme. Meanwhile, television producers sought to devote several episodes from Dateline NBC to Betsy's story, which uncovers Pam's past and makes her a suspect in the case.

Cast

Main 
 Renée Zellweger as Pam Hupp, a self-appointed "businesswoman" arrested for the murder of Betsy Faria.
 Josh Duhamel as Joel Schwartz, the defense attorney for Russ Faria.
 Judy Greer as Leah Askey, the Lincoln County prosecutor who tried Russ Faria twice for his wife's murder.
 Gideon Adlon as Mariah Day, Betsy and Russ's 17-year-old daughter.
 Sean Bridgers as Mark Hupp, Pam Hupp's husband.
 Suanne Spoke as Janet, Betsy's mother and Mariah's grandmother.
 Mac Brandt as Detective McCarrick, a detective assigned to Betsy's murder case.
 Katy Mixon as Betsy Faria, Russ's wife, Mariah Day's mother, and the murder victim.
 Glenn Fleshler as Russ Faria, Betsy's husband and Mariah's father.

Guest 
 Patricia French as Minnie, Pam's neighbor.
 Ben Chase as Nate Swanson, a defense attorney working with Joel.
 Drew Scheid as Travis Hupp, the son of Pam and Mark.
 Celia Weston as Shirley Neumann, Pam's mother.
 Heather Magee as Chris Mennemeyer, the judge in Russ's trial.
 Alice Barrett-Mitchell as Cathy Singer, a journalist and producer at Dateline.
 Dane Davenport as Mike Wood, a candidate for Lincoln County prosecutor and Joel's friend.
 Jeff Ryan Baker as Louis Gumpenberger, a Missouri resident who is shot and killed by Pam.

Dateline journalist Keith Morrison provides the show's narration.

Episodes

Production

Development 
On January 10, 2020, NBC announced its plans to shut down the unscripted production unit Peacock Productions. Variety reported that the decision was sparked by the rise of streaming services and a necessity for "higher-quality productions". In a statement, NBC said the company was "shifting its documentary strategy to an entirely new model" that would be "consistent with industry trends". Two weeks later, on January 23, NBC News Studios was launched. Liz Cole, executive producer of Dateline NBC and the then-president of Peacock Productions, announced she would also serve as president of the new company. The studio's intent is to produce content for emerging platforms, documentaries, docu-series, and select scripted programming. At the time of its announcement, NBC News Studios had already attained partnerships with Blumhouse Television and Focus Features, with the former revealing they were in negotiations to develop and produce scripted programs based on stories told on Dateline. In a statement, Cole said "the documentary business is certainly more robust than it ever has been. More and more people are seeking out that content".

On May 19, 2020, it was reported that NBC News Studios and Blumhouse Television were developing an untitled scripted television series based on coverage from Dateline about the involvement of Pam Hupp in the murder of Betsy Faria as well as the sentencing and release of her husband, Russ Faria. Since 2014, Dateline has assigned multiple episodes to the story and created a podcast centered around the case in 2019 titled "The Thing About Pam". In a statement, Cole said that "having been at the forefront of the true-crime genre for so long, we know better than anyone that truth is often stranger than fiction, and with the twists and turns in this case, we saw a real opportunity to present it in a scripted format". In addition to the series announcement, it was revealed Cole would executive produce alongside Jason Blum, Marci Wiseman, and Jeremy Gold.

Casting 

The limited series was given a six-episode order and titled The Thing About Pam on February 4, 2021, with Renée Zellweger joining the cast to portray Hupp in her network television debut and attaching herself as an executive producer through her production company Big Picture Co. It was also reported that NBCUniversal Chairman of Entertainment Content Susan Rosner Rovner would oversee the series and that Jessika Borsiczky would write and serve as showrunner. In a statement, Borsiczky said the murder case she was adapting could be interpreted as both a whodunit and a character study. Additional executive producers included Carmella Casinelli, Borsiczky, Noah Oppenheim, and Chris McCumber. In May 2021, Jenny Klein signed a one-year first-look deal with Blumhouse Television and joined The Thing About Pam as a writer and executive producer.

Marci Wiseman, following her resignation as Co-President of Blumhouse Television in October 2020, was later removed as an executive producer for the series. In June 2021, Josh Duhamel was added to the cast with Mary Margaret Kunze joining as an executive producer. By August 2021, The Thing About Pam was in the final stages of pre-production with casting still underway in New Orleans. On August 24, it was announced Borsiczky had exited the series as writer and showrunner due to creative differences but that she would remain an executive producer for the time being; Klein was appointed as the new showrunner. On August 27, it was reported that pre-production would be suspended for some time due to Hurricane Ida with a filming start date set for early September. On August 30, Judy Greer and Katy Mixon joined the cast. On September 24, Gideon Adlon, Sean Bridgers, Glenn Fleshler, Suanne Spoke, and Mac Brandt were added to the cast.

Filming 
On September 28, 2021, Scott Winant was announced to be directing the first two episodes as well as executive producing. Filming was postponed until October 1, 2021. At the second annual BlumFest in October, Zellweger spoke with Dateline correspondent Keith Morrison about portraying Hupp, "Truth is stranger than fiction. She's notorious, not famous. It won't be the same as coming to understanding a person's life experiences within context. [I am] going to be researching and trying to understand just based on the limited information that's available. I'm going to play the person that you sort of illuminated in your podcast and try to understand what makes a person like that tick". Throughout October, Zellweger was photographed wearing face and body prosthetics to portray Hupp. Filming took place in New Orleans and Hammond, Louisiana.

Makeup artist Arjen Tuiten said it took eighty minutes to apply prosthetics on Zellweger. "It was Arjen who did all of the work. Arjen and Benadryl. I'm allergic to adhesives, and so there was a lot of comedy in the preparation," the actress remarked. After adding the prosthetics, the makeup took between two and four hours to apply. Hair department head Lawrence Davis and makeup department head Carla Brenholtz said they added light touches to prosecutor Leah Askey (played by Greer), based on a look anchored in Troy, Missouri. Zellweger described her physical transformation as "pretty much head to toe". When asked why they did not cast an actress with a closer resemblance to Hupp's physical appearance, McCumber replied, "When a two-time Oscar winner calls and says, 'I'm obsessed with this story and I want to play Pam and I want to produce, you say, 'Yes, yes, yes, yes.' And our job at that point is to provide Renee and the rest of the cast with all the tools they need to embody these characters."

Music 
The score was composed by Giona Ostinelli and Sonya Belousova. The theme implemented the use of an English horn, a prepared piano with coins between the strings, a harmonica, "ka-ching" sounds, a custom-made Italian instrument combining a waterphone and daxophone, and the sound of someone slurping. The slurping effect, which the duo came up with before filming began, was also used in the sound design.

Release 
First-look images and a trailer were released in early February. Initial responses to the promotional material were negative; Libby Hall from IndieWire called Zellweger's use of prosthetics and a padded suit an example of fatphobia. The series held a premiere in Los Angeles on February 28, 2022, and premiered on NBC on March 8.

Reception

Critical response 
 Metacritic, which uses a weighted average, assigned a score of 55 out of 100 based on 18 critics, indicating "mixed or average reviews".

Zellweger's performance divided critics. Kimberly Potts of TheWrap said it appeared Zellweger was "thoroughly enjoying her time" as Hupp. John Doyle of The Globe and Mail said the actress "brings an equal amount of vinegary exuberance to the work." IndieWires Ben Travers, on the other hand, called her performance "exaggerated". From Vulture, Roxana Hadadi said "Zellweger is simultaneously broadly cartoonish and blandly nonspecific. She squints so much that her eyes lose whatever interiority they might have reflected; there is no real difference between her smile or her frown." Varietys Daniel D'Addario criticized the "uncanny" prosthetics and the appearance of a Dateline producer as a character, writing, "It'd be a shame if Zellweger's first acting gig after her Oscar-boosted return to Hollywood were, ultimately, little more than NBC cross-promotion."

The show's comedic tone was criticized. Brian Lowry at CNN called it a failed attempt to be "the next Fargo". Liam Mathews at TVGuide said the "deliciously satisfying" tone was similar to that of the Coen brothers, but that its use to convey the story of a real murder would make "you feel [a] little queasy." Ciara Wardlow, writing for RogerEbert.com, categorized it as "a watchable if often underwhelming true crime docudrama that wants to both be weird and play it safe, ending up in a strange middle ground between the two." In a more positive review, The A.V. Clubs Gwen Ihnat said "The Thing About Pam does an impressive job of translating an addictive tale to the small screen."

Ratings 
The premiere episode increased its viewership by 205% after seven days, from 2.9 million viewers when it aired to 8.7 million viewers after a week with delayed viewing across linear and DVR, as well as Hulu, NBC.com, the NBC app, and Peacock. By the end of its run on April 12, 2022, The Thing About Pam had become NBC's highest-rated freshman series of the 2021–2022 television season. It also had a positive impact on Dateline, especially on the viewership of the episodes about Hupp that inspired the series.

Accolades 
The series was one of 94 out of the 200 most-popular scripted television series that received the ReFrame Stamp for the years 2021 to 2022. The stamp is awarded by the gender equity coalition ReFrame and industry database IMDbPro for film and television projects that are proven to have gender-balanced hiring, with stamps being awarded to projects that hire female-identifying people, especially women of color, in four out of eight key roles for their production.

References

External links 
 
 

2020s American comedy-drama television series
2020s American drama television miniseries
2022 American television series debuts
2022 American television series endings
NBC News
NBC original programming
Television series based on actual events
Television series set in 2011
Television shows about murder
Television shows filmed in New Orleans
Television shows set in Missouri
True crime television series